The 2009 Honda Indy 200 presented by Westfield Insurance was the thirteenth round of the 17-race 2009 IndyCar Series season, and was held on August 9, 2009 at the  Mid-Ohio Sports Car Course in Lexington, Ohio.

The race saw the return of Oriol Servià, who replaced Robert Doornbos in the #06 Newman/Haas/Lanigan Racing machine. Doornbos moved to the #33 car run by HVM Racing, with whom he had success with in the 2007 Champ Car season. Paul Tracy replaced Mario Moraes in the #5 car for KV Racing Technology, as Moraes was in Brazil following the death of his father.

Scott Dixon won his 20th IRL-sanctioned race, after dominating the race for the last 49 laps, winning by nearly half a minute from championship rivals Ryan Briscoe and Dario Franchitti. Dixon's win gave him the championship lead by three points from Briscoe, and also saw him surpass Sam Hornish Jr.'s tally of 19 career IRL victories.

Grid

Race

Standings after the race 

Drivers' Championship standings

References 

Honda 200
Indy 200 at Mid-Ohio
Honda 200
Honda 200